) was a town located in Minamitakaki District, Nagasaki, Japan.

As of 2003, the town had an estimated population of 11,863 and a density of 505.24 persons per km2. The total area was 23.48 km2.

On January 1, 2006, Ariake was merged into the expanded city of Shimabara.

Dissolved municipalities of Nagasaki Prefecture